Henry Overton Wills I (2 March 1761 – 1826) was a British merchant who founded the firm of W.D. & H.O. Wills in Bristol, England, which eventually became one of the largest tobacco companies in late 19th-century Britain, and later became the largest constituent part of Imperial Tobacco. The 1966 Guinness Book of Records named the Wills family, descended from him, as containing the largest number of millionaires in the British Isles, of which 14 left estates in excess of one million pounds since 1910, totalling 55 million, of which 27 million was paid in death duties. Wills is said to have been a non-smoker, despite the fact that he is regarded as one of the founders of the British tobacco industry.

Origins
He was born on 2 March 1761 in Salisbury, England, the son of Edmund Wills, a watchmaker, & his mother Rebecca, daughter of Henry Overton of Andover, Hampshire.

Career
He came as a young man by coach from Salisbury to Bristol where he formed a partnership with Samuel Watkins to open a tobacco shop on 73 Castle Street, Bristol. They named their operation Wills, Watkins & Co. When Watkins retired from the business in 1789, it became Wills & Co, with Wills as sole proprietor. He soon found new partners, and the company merged in 1791 with the firm of Peter Lilly, which had a mill to grind tobacco into snuff. Lilly and Wills named the new company Lilly, Wills & Co, and they consolidated the operations into Lilly's shop at 111–12 Redcliff Street, Bristol. In 1793 the company name was simplified to Lilly and Wills. When Lilly retired in 1803, he was replaced by Samuel Ditchett, and the firm became Wills and Ditchett.

Wills' partnership with Lilly proved to be profitable, and the company in 1804 was valued at £15,435 (2017 value: $1.67 million U.S.). In 1819 they again changed the name of their firm, to Wills, Ditchett & Co., Wills by this time having brought into the operation his sons William Day Wills and Henry Overton Wills II, first as apprentices and later as junior partners.

He continued to be involved in the firm until his death on 1 December 1826 in Bristol, when his sons took over their father's interest in the business. They subsequently became senior partners of the company in 1830 when their father's partner Samuel Ditchett retired, and they renamed the company W.D. & H.O. Wills, which grew to become one of the largest tobacco importers in Victorian England.

Religious and political activity
He raised his children in the strict Congregationalist faith, and his descendants actively supported the church in Bristol for more than a century. His sons were particularly generous in their support for non-conformist religious causes. The Wills family were also active in local politics, both by supporting the Liberal Party and by standing themselves for election to city offices as Liberal candidates.

Marriage and children
On 24 June 1790, when he was the sole proprietor in his tobacco venture, in Bristol he married Anne Day, eldest daughter of William Day of Bristol, a linen draper. By Anne he had the following two sons:
William Day Wills (1797–1865), eldest son, who in 1830 with his brother co-founded W.D. & H.O. Wills, a company that by the late 1800s became the largest importer of tobacco, and manufacturer of tobacco products in Britain. His son William Wills, 1st Baron Winterstoke became the first chairman of Imperial Tobacco.
Henry Overton Wills II ( 1800–1871), with his brother was a co-founder of W.D.& H.O. Wills. His son Henry Overton Wills III founded the creation of the University of Bristol and became its first Chancellor, and two of his other sons Sir Edward Payson Wills and Sir Frederick Wills became baronets. Another  son, Sir Frank William Wills became a noted architect, who was knighted for his accomplishments.

References 

1761 births
1826 deaths
Businesspeople from Bristol
18th-century English businesspeople
19th-century English businesspeople
Henry Overton I